A trade office, sometimes known as a trade representation, commercial office, or trade mission, is an official establishment that promotes the commercial interests of a government (such as a city, state, or country) in a foreign capital. The head of such an establishment is typically called a trade representative or commercial representative.

Taiwan

Due to the limited recognition of the Republic of China (Taiwan) as a result of the People's Republic of China's One-China policy, many countries do not have formal diplomatic relations with the Taiwanese government. Taiwan's interests in these countries and these countries' interests in Taiwan are usually represented by one or more trade missions which function as de facto embassies or consulates.

See also
 Office of the United States Trade Representative
 Hong Kong Economic and Trade Office

International trade